Luke Reynolds (born April 20, 1979) is an American guitarist and multi-instrumentalist, artist, writer and producer.

Career

Studio work 
As a guitarist and multi-instrumentalist, he has worked with Sharon Van Etten, The Staves, Adrian Utley, Regina Spektor, Rick Rubin, Neko Case, Sarah Jarosz, Miranda Lambert, Guster, Phosphorescent, Rayland Baxter, and The War on Drugs.

Solo work 
Reynolds has released seven solo albums—Vanishing Places Vol. 2 Glaciers In Iceland (2020), The Neighborhood (2019), Vanishing Places Vol. 1 Bears Ears (2019), After The Flood (2014), Maps (2010), Pictures And Sound (2008), and The Space Between the Lines (2006).

Early career 
In 1999, Reynolds moved to Nashville to pursue music and attend Belmont University.  In 2002, he co-founded the band Blue Merle who signed with Island Records and released one album - Burning in the Sun - produced by Stephen Harris. Following Blue Merle, Reynolds left Nashville and signed with Vanguard Records, releasing Pictures And Sound produced by Jacquire King, in August 2008.

Guster 
Before starting their 2010 fall tour, Guster announced that Joe Pisapia would not be touring with the band. Instead, Joe would be touring with k.d. lang with whom he had been writing songs. It was also announced that Luke Reynolds would be filling in for Joe starting September 12, 2010. In 2014 the band began recording Evermotion in Cottage Grove, Oregon. Evermotion was released on January 13, 2015, and was produced by Richard Swift. Most recently, Guster released their album Look Alive in January 2019, recorded with producers Leo Abrahams and John Congleton. This is the band's second album with Reynolds as a full member and co-writer, following their Richard Swift produced LP, Evermotion.

Select discography
2022 Crybaby / Tegan and Sara / (Mom + Pop) 
2022 Home, Before and After / Regina Spektor / (Sire/Warner) 
2021 No End In Sight / Luke Reynolds and Adrian Utley / (Amazon Music)
2021 Sunflower / Briston Maroney / (Canvasback Music) 
2020 Vanishing Places Vol. 2 Glaciers In Iceland / Luke Reynolds
2019 The Neighborhood / Luke Reynolds
2019 Vanishing Places Vol. 1 Bears Ears / Luke Reynolds
2019 Remind Me Tomorrow / Sharon Van Etten / (Jagjaguwar) 
2019 Look Alive / Guster / (Ocho Mule) 
2018 C'est La Vie / Phosphorescent / (Dead Oceans) 
2018 Hell-On / Neko Case / (Anti-) 
2016 The Weight of These Wings / Miranda Lambert / (RCA) 
2016 Undercurrent / Sarah Jarosz / (Sugar Hill) 
2015 Imaginary Man / Rayland Baxter / (ATO) 
2015 Evermotion / Guster / (Ocho Mule) 
2014 After the Flood  / Luke Reynolds
2013 Live Acoustic / Guster / (Ocho Mule)
2011 On the Ocean EP / Guster / (Ocho Mule)
2011 Loverboy / Brett Dennen / (Dualtone Records)
2011 Self Titled / The Belle Brigade / (Warner Bros)
2010 Maps / Luke Reynolds 
2008 Pictures And Sound / Pictures And Sound / (Vanguard)
2006 Space Between the Lines EP / Luke Reynolds
2005 Live at Bull Moose / Blue Merle / (Island)
2005 Burning in the Sun / Blue Merle / (Island)
2004 The Fires EP / Blue Merle / (Island)

References

American indie rock musicians
1979 births
Living people
American singer-songwriters
People from Cornwall, Vermont
Guster members
21st-century American singers